Barducci is an Italian surname. Notable people with this surname include: 

 Aligi Barducci (1913–1944), Italian soldier and resistance leader
 Antonio Barducci (born 1996), Italian rugby union player
 Giovanni Battista Barducci (died 1661), Italian Roman Catholic prelate

Italian-language surnames